Kingway Brewery Holdings Limited is a leading beer maker in China. It is a subsidiary of government-owned Guangdong Holdings Group, the biggest Hong Kong-based enterprise owned by the Guangdong provincial government. The Dutch brewing company Heineken International owns a 21% share in the company. It produces, distributes, and markets beer in more than 20 provinces under such labels as "Kingway", "Kingway Draft", and "Super Fresh Kingway".

In February 2013, Kingway Brewery announced that the company had agreed to be taken over by China Resources Enterprise, Ltd in a deal worth $863.2 million.

See also
Beer and breweries in China

References

External links
Kingway Brewery Holdings Limited

Companies listed on the Hong Kong Stock Exchange
Chinese companies established in 1990
Drink companies of China
Breweries in China
Manufacturing companies based in Shenzhen
Government-owned companies of China
Chinese beer brands
Food and drink companies established in 1990